Bălușeni is a commune in Botoșani County, Western Moldavia, Romania. It is composed of six villages: Bălușeni, Bălușenii Noi, Buzeni, Coșuleni, Draxini and Zăicești.

References

Communes in Botoșani County
Localities in Western Moldavia